Jakarta International College (also known as Monash College Jakarta or JIC), founded in 2002, is an Indonesian international college set up for students who wish to further their university education overseas. JIC offers four internationally recognized education programs that help students transition from high school to university, namely Monash College Diploma Program, Monash University Foundation Year (MUFY), Monash English Bridging Program (MEB) and Pathway to American Degree Program.

Campus 
Jakarta International College campus is located on the second floor of the Graha Mandiri Building. The campus encompasses 18 classes, from lecture rooms to small classes suitable for group discussions and more personal tutorial sessions. Each class is equipped with whiteboard, computer, and a projector. The campus facilities include library, canteen, wi-fi internet coverage and student lounge.

Located in the business district of Jakarta, Menteng is an international community with numerous foreign embassies and one of the safest areas in Jakarta, JIC is situated in a location off the 3-in-1 route and can be accessed by public transport. The campus is walking distance with a shopping mall, five-star hotels, residential areas and restaurants.

Location 
JIC was established back in 2002 and is the first and the only Monash College in Indonesia. Since its establishment, more than 1200 students have enrolled and graduated from the college and transferred into universities in Australia.

Program

Monash College Diploma program 
Monash College is designed for students who wish to focus their year 12 studies in areas related to their future degree. Upon completion of Monash College, student can gain direct entry into the second year of Monash University.

There are two Monash College Diploma courses available in JIC - Business and Arts (Humanities) – each comprises 16 compulsory and two elective units. Student intakes are in February, June and October each year.

Monash University Foundation Year Program (MUFY) 
MUFY program provides a 10 months academic program. The program helps students to prepare for university study upon completion, students can choose any courses and gain direct entry into the first year of Monash University or other universities of their choice. Each year, student intakes are in January and July.

Monash English Bridging Program (MEB) 
The Monash English Bridging Program is designed for students with a conditional offer (English language proficiency) for Monash College Diploma Program. Students receive a Package Offer (MEB and Monash College) if they satisfy Monash College's academic requirement but fall short of the English language requirement (where the student fails to achieve the minimum required score in IELTS or TOEFL test).  The program lasts for 15 weeks and successful completion of MEB allows direct admission into Monash College with no need to re-sit an IELTS or TOEFL test.

Classes in MEB prepares student for university studies by developing their skills in reading, writing, speaking and listening, note taking and research that students will be undertaking within their Monash course. Each year, student intakes are in June and October.

Pathway to American Degree Program 
This program enables students to complete up to two years of American Universities studies in JIC and subsequently transfer all credits to Western Michigan University in America to complete the final two years of the undergraduate program. Alternatively, students can choose to transfer their credits to other American universities of their choice. Each year, student intakes are February, June and October.

References 

Colleges in Indonesia